Loachapoka High School is a high school in Loachapoka, Alabama, enrolling grades 7–12. The school enrolls 296 students, and is one of four high schools in the Lee County School District along with Beauregard, Beulah, and Smiths Station High Schools.

History

While Loachapoka had its own high school in the late 19th and early 20th centuries, by the 1930s students in Loachapoka attended high school at either Drake or Auburn High Schools in nearby Auburn. In 1968, the Auburn City Schools ceased providing regular high school services for the Loachapoka area, and Loachapoka students were bused to Beauregard High School, so that students from the mostly African American Loachapoka area would have an opportunity to attend an integrated high school. Attendance at Beauregard, however, required some students to take round-trip bus rides of up to 96 miles daily; to limit this, the Lee County Schools Board of Education requested to expand the existing Loachapoka Junior High School (grades 7–10) to a full high school. The federal courts rejected this request to create Loachapoka High four times: in May 1970, July 1970, October 1970, and January 1971, arguing that opening Loachapoka High would "substantially decrease the desegregation in the Lee County School System".

In October 1971, Lee County Schools again requested to create Loachapoka High, with the courts opposing the request yet again, but allowing that they would reconsider if all of the students in the Loachapoka area were required to attend the school. Auburn High School agreed to stop allowing transfers from the Loachapoka area by 1973 so that Loachapoka High would be allowed to open. In the fall of 1973, Loachapoka High School opened, offering a full high school education in Loachapoka for the first time in decades.

Athletics
Athletic Director- Jerome Tate
Football- Headed by  Jerome Tate
Basketball- Headed by Terry Murph
Baseball- Headed by  Mason Wilson
Softball- Headed by Damien Sinclair
Track- Headed by Derrick Levitt

Mighty Marching Indian Band

Loachapoka is widely known for their marching band. And with their dynamic drum majors and dance team they are who they say they are "The Baddest Band in the Land". The Mighty Marching Indians band formed in the late 1970s. They are a show style band. They perform at every home and away football games. In the 2004–05 season, the marching band reached its highest number of members with 72, making it one of the biggest Class 1A band in the state of Alabama. Current band director Shane Colquhoun has led the Mighty Marching Indians in a positive direction. In the past the Mighty Marching Indians have performed at the Battle of the Bands in Montgomery, Mardi Gras Parade in Mobile, Star Musical Festival in Atlanta, etc.

References

External links
Loachapoka High School – official site

Educational institutions established in 1973
Public high schools in Alabama
Schools in Lee County, Alabama
Public middle schools in Alabama
1973 establishments in Alabama